Sobukwe is a surname. Notable people with the surname include: 

 Robert Sobukwe (1924–1978), South African anti-apartheid activist
 Veronica Sobukwe (1927–2018), South African nurse and anti-apartheid activist

Xhosa-language surnames